This is a list of the publications released for the Deadlands: Hell on Earth roleplaying game, which is a continuation of Deadlands: The Weird West, both of which were published by Pinnacle Entertainment Group. Hell on Earth was originally published using the same custom rules as The Weird West, and has since been republished as Hell on Earth Reloaded, using the Savage Worlds rules.

Core rulebooks and expansions

Locations

Character classes

Adventures

Dime Novels
As with Deadlands: The Weird West, these Dime Novels contained a work of short fiction followed by rules for implementing elements from it into an existing game.

Miscellaneous

Cardstock Cowboys
Cardstock Cowboys were a line of 3D stand-up figures that could be used for miniature-based combat in Deadlands games, available in a series of themed packs.

Deadlands: Hell on Earth d20

Deadlands: Hell on Earth Reloaded

References

Deadlands
Science fiction role-playing game supplements